Timothy Adams (born June 4, 1986) is a Canadian professional poker player from Burlington, Ontario who focuses on poker tournaments. He is currently the second biggest Canadian tournament winner in poker behind Daniel Negreanu.

Career
Adams began playing poker when in was 18. He played online under the alias "Tim0thee" and earned approximately $530,000 on Full Tilt Poker and nearly $2,000,000 on PokerStars in online tournaments. His first WSOP was in 2007. He earned approximately $400,000 at the 2012 WSOP and won his first bracelet in the $2,500 No Limit Hold'em - Four Handed event.

In March 2019, Adams won the Triton Poker Super High Roller Series Jeju HKD 2,000,000 Main Event winning $3,536,550. Later that year, he successfully executed a huge bluff against Mikita Badziakouski at the WSOPE €250K Super High Roller, but did not cash.

From January to June 2020, Adams cashed in tournaments for approximately $5.9 million. Adams won the Super High Roller Bowl a second time at the 2020 Super High Roller Bowl in Sochi winning $3,600,000. He won the $10,300 NLH 6-Max for $243,988 at the partypoker 2020 Poker Masters high stakes tournament series which was hosted online due to the COVID-19 pandemic.

Adams total live poker tournament winnings exceed $24,300,000.

World Series of Poker

References

External links
Adams at Hendonmob.com

1986 births
Canadian poker players
Living people
Sportspeople from Burlington, Ontario
World Series of Poker bracelet winners